Dimitrios Loufakis (born 1 April 2000) is a Greek professional footballer who plays as a right winger for Apollon Pontus.

References

2000 births
Living people
Greek footballers
Football League (Greece) players
Super League Greece 2 players
Super League Greece players
Apollon Pontou FC players
Athlitiki Enosi Larissa F.C. players
Association football wingers
Footballers from Thessaloniki